Heim is a village in Heim municipality in Trøndelag county, Norway. Heim Church is located in the village. The village was the administrative centre of the old municipality of Heim that existed from 1911 until 1964.

Name
The parish of Heim was established in 1884. It is named after the old Heim farm (Old Norse: Heimr), since the Heim Church is built on its ground. The name is identical with the word heimr which means "home", "homestead", or "farm".

References

Villages in Trøndelag
Heim, Norway